A carbon audit regime is a means of accounting for quantifiable greenhouse gas control efforts.  It establishes that the claimed reductions in emissions or enhancements of carbon sinks, has actually occurred and is stable.

See also

Audit regime
Carbon offset

Climate change policy